Transgender genocide or trans genocide is a term used by scholars and activists to describe an elevated level of systematic discrimination and violence against transgender people. The term is related to the common meaning as well as the legal concept of genocide, which the Genocide Convention describes as an intentional effort to completely or partially destroy a group based on its nationality, ethnicity, race, or religion. Some legal scholars and transgender rights activists have argued this definition should be expanded to include transgender persons.

Background 

Historians have described as genocidal selected actions against transgender people, including colonialist and Nazi activities that occurred before the term genocide was used in international law. Adam Jones wrote in his 2017 book Genocide: A Comprehensive Introduction that "In recent years, as gay rights have become gradually more accepted and respected, the burden of atrocity has increasingly targeted transgender women and male transvestites."

Nazi Germany 

Matthew Waites examines the absence of sexuality, gender, sexual orientation or gender identity as group categories in the Genocide Convention. He argues that those targeted by the Nazis because of their non-conforming gender identities should be recognized as a genocide unique from the Holocaust. This area of research is underdeveloped and the number of transgender victims is unknown. Heather Panter, writing in the book Genocide and Victimology, noted that the number of transgender people targeted by the Nazis was likely lower than the number of gay people targeted.

The Institute for Sexology published journals on trans and queer issues, hosted the D'Eon Organization, which was founded in 1930 to advocate trans rights, and pioneered early gender-affirming surgeries. Matt Fuller and Leah Owen argued that while Nazi anti-queer ideology was "incoherent and erratic", they targeted transgender people with genocide and memoricide. They described the looting and burning of the books at the Institute for Sexology as a form of memoricide. They cited Bauer (2017) to explain a psychological element to this, stating "the mere presence of the bodies and desires of trans people was a challenge, threat, and source of anxiety to many Nazis, meaning they – or the physical archive that reflected their identity – had to be destroyed."

Fuller and Owen found that the Nazis provided varied justifications for their targeting of queer people and that they often conflated trans issues with homosexuality. They noted that in a document outlining the division of labor in the Reich office for the Combatting of Homosexuality and Abortion, "transvesites" were listed as a responsibility of the organization, separately from "all manifestations of homosexuality" and "combating of all enemies of positive population growth", suggesting trans identity was conceived of as a distinct issue and threat by the Nazis. They noted that as part of the 1933 mass incarceration of gay men in Fuhlsbüttel concentration camp, Hamburg city administration told the chief of police to "pay particular attention to transvestites and to deliver them to the concentration camps if necessary."
 	
They further argued that transmasculine and transfeminine individuals faced inconsistent treatment. Masculine presentations from those assigned female at birth were stigmatized: the National Socialist Women's League published a book in 1934 which warned gender ambiguity represented "signs of degeneration emanating from an alien race … inimical to reproduction and for this reason damaging to the Volk. Healthy races do not artificially blur sexual differences" and Himmler complained in 1937 about the "nauseat[ing] catastrophe that was masculinizing [‘young girls and women’] so that, over time, the difference between the sexes, the polarity, is blurred. From there, the path to homosexuality is not too far off." Fuller and Owen noted an inconsistency in individual accounts of transmasculine people. One was forcibly detransitioned, another was detained in Lichtenburg concentration and 
released 10 months later with a permit from the Gestapo to wear men's clothing, and another was allowed to dress as a man without a permit following a medical examination and a promise that they had never engaged in homosexual relations.

In 2022, the Regional Court of Cologne ruled that denying that trans people were targeted by the Nazis qualifies as "a denial of Nazi crimes".

Indonesia 

In the mid-1960s in South Sulawesi, an Islamic militia (Ansor) and an Islamic purification movement (led by Kahar Muzakkar) stigmatized, persecuted, and murdered many among the bissu, a transgender social group. The bissu were seen as objectionable under Islam and, in 1966, an Islamic "Operation Repent" targeted nonconforming Indonesian genders. Bissu rituals were violently suppressed, bissu heads were shorn, and bissu were ordered to conform to male gender roles or die. To demonstrate this coercive threat, a bissu leader was decapitated.

Brazil 
Jones describes Brazil's treatment of transgender people as "unquestionably gendercidal", noting that at least one trans person was reported killed every 27 hours in 2014. Brazil has had the highest amount of transgender murder victims in the world since 2009, with the average lifespan of a transgender Brazilian being less than half that of a cisgender Brazilian. Activists in Brazil have also described the targeting of transgender people, particularly Afro-Brazilian transgender women, as a genocide.

United States 

Sue E. Spivey and Christine Robinson have argued that the ex-gay movement, which encourages transgender as well as other LGBT people to renounce their identities, advocates social death and therefore could meet some legal definitions of genocide. Spivey and Robinson argued that "by waging a culture war using hate propaganda and misusing scientific research to gain public legitimacy, the movement seeks to deploy state powers and the medical profession to perpetrate genocidal acts on its behalf."

Some US laws have been described, including by journalists Emily St. James and Saeed Jones and ACLU attorney Chase Strangio, as fitting the United Nations definition of genocide, including those banning proper transgender healthcare ("causing serious bodily or mental harm to members of the group; deliberately inflicting on the group conditions of life calculated to bring about its physical destruction in whole or in part"), and those mandating that trans children be taken away by the state ("forcibly transferring children of the group to another group").

The compiling of lists of transgender citizens, such as that done by the state of Texas, has been criticized by trans advocates who feared the state would "use the information to further persecute the already vulnerable trans community."

The increased targeting of trans people by right wing militia groups has also been described as threatening genocide, and has led many trans people in the United States to, in response, stockpile weapons and gear - including AR-15 rifles and modern body armor - while training, sometimes in groups, to use them as necessary.

Scholarship

International law 

Scholars have argued that the definition of genocide should be applied to transgender persons, or expanded to cover transgender persons, because they are victims of institutional discrimination, persecution, and violence. In a 2008 academic article in hate studies, Jeremy Kidd and Tarynn Witten argue that abuse and violence against transgender people makes them a target of genocide as defined by the Genocide Convention, which would need to be reconfigured for their eligibility. In line with the convention, they argue that transphobic discrimination and violence are not random or atomized, but rather come from the intent "to eradicate a group of people who violate a widely held and popularly reinforced norm of binary gender with a connection to heteronormative sexuality." They say that this motive of "eradication/annihilation" (p. 51) is systemic, pandemic, institutionalized (e.g., through the penal system and military), and spread widely through media and film. They say that transgender people face an increased risk of abuse and violence throughout their lives and that, despite being targeted in ways that fit some criteria of the Genocide Convention, they do not have access to the same legal protections as other groups.

The Rome Statute, a 1998 treaty that established the International Criminal Court and codified investigations into genocide, outlines a definition of gender-based persecution. This definition, however, only "refers to the two sexes, male and female." Valerie Oosterveld attributed this definition to conservative political pressure from states like Azerbaijan, the Holy See, and some nongovernmental organizations in the lead-up to the treaty's adoption. While this definition has not yet been litigated at the ICC, it is likely that it would be used to exclude transgender people from international legal protections.

In a 2014 article, Brian Kritz assessed the ability of the International Criminal Court to protect and promote transgender rights, arguing that existing law should be explicitly extended to transgender people. He noted that the lack of existing protections for transgender people under international law was in-and-of-itself "a violation of the basic human rights of the global transgender and intersex populations."

Scholars have made similar arguments regarding the legal definition of crimes against humanity.

In the past, international courts have interpreted genocidal sexual violence to be a problem of cisgender women alone, often classifying the same systematic sexual violence against all members, who are not cisgender women, as crimes against humanity, as was done by the United Nations International Fact-Finding Mission for Myanmar. Eichert argues that this interpretation "discounts the suffering of victims and needlessly weakens attempts to identify, prevent, and punish the crime of genocide" and pleads for the field to adopt a broader understanding of genocidal sexual violence, which is not limited to cisgender women alone.

Genocide studies 
Genocide studies research that focuses exclusively on transgender people is rare, with Lily Nellans noting that "the unique and specific experiences of queer people during genocide remain absent from this type of research, limiting our understanding of genocidal processes". Henry Theriault has argued that discrimination against transgender people is "largely tolerated" despite the fact that identical laws targeting other marginalized people would spark severe public outcry.

Alexander Laban Hinton, an anthropologist focused on genocide, has criticized what he characterizes as "the prioritization of certain protected groups and not others" in established legal definitions of genocide, specifically noting transgender people as a group that could never be targeted by genocide in the status quo. Haley Marie Brown describes violence against transgender women as a "life force atrocity" that is justified using genocidal logic, describing how such violence is often coupled with attempts to eliminate any evidence of a persons transness through complete destruction of their bodies.

Leah Owen, a lecturer at Swansea University, has argued that anti-transgender ideologies rely on "discourses of 'toxification'", drawing on research in Genocide Studies and Prevention that proposed "toxification" as a more precise alternative to the traditional fourth stage of genocide, dehumanization. Owen compares Nielsen's concept of toxification, in which groups of people are compared to pathogens or threats and their removal from society is necessitated, to statements from Popes Benedict XVI and Francis, Janice Raymond, Abigail Shrier, and Helen Joyce, arguing that regardless of agreement on other issues, anti-transgender activists consistently seek to reduce or eliminate transgender people's public presence. Nevertheless, she refrains from claiming that the modern anti-gender movement is inciting genocide yet, arguing that it lacks a securitizing urge to mobilize against transgender people.

Biomedical and genetic ethics 
Rachel Anne Williams, in a 2019 book, suggested that biomedical research on trans identity may increase the practice of trans genocide. Such concerns were reflected in the findings of two 2022 articles in genetics journals about perspectives on trans-associated genetic research (TAGR). Many of those surveyed by Rajkovic et alia believe that genetic research could end up with a kind of "eugenics" that would, in effect, "eliminate" transgender people, while some respondents feared that, in more transphobic areas, trans-associated research would lead to "medical genocide."

Sterilization that is forced upon transgender people, in order to obtain legal recognition, is characterized by political theorist Anna Carastathis as a violation of reproductive rights, eugenic, and genocidal. On the extent of this practice among European counties, she cites a 2013 report by the UN Special Rapporteur on Torture and Other Cruel, Inhuman or Degrading Treatment or Punishment. Recognizing that transgender persons are not covered by legal definitions of genocide, she argues "that trans people are systematically written out of legal existence" both through the compulsory sterilization and their exclusion from the Genocide Convention. In contradistinction to Carastathis, political scientist Jemima Repo argues that compulsory sterilization does give transgender people a political existence, but at the expense of a capacity to extend kinship (i.e., family) into the future. As a result, Repo says that reproduction, at least in Finland, becomes a mode of transgender resistance in the face of sterilization demands.

Other fields 
Transgender genocide has been examined by scholars of queer studies, hate studies, and other fields.

Activism and criticism 

Trans and other queer activists have used the term "transgender genocide" to oppose discrimination and violence against transgender people, especially when seen as a global phenomenon. In 2013, it was reported that, "...a coalition of NGOs from South America and Europe started the 'Stop Trans Genocide' campaign." For example, the term was used by a Latin American trans activist who sought asylum in Germany. In 2018, Planned Parenthood of New York City president Laura McQuade said in a speech that a Trump administration proposal to change federal recognition of transgender persons would lead to genocide.

The use of the term "transgender genocide" has been contested by hate crime expert Bernie Farber of the Canadian Jewish Congress as being insensitive to victims of recognized genocides, such as the Holocaust, because it does not meet the legal test, despite the "terrible crimes against the community."

See also 
 AIDS–Holocaust metaphor
 Black genocide
 White genocide conspiracy theory
 Yogyakarta Principles

References

Further reading

 
Genocide
Transphobia
Violence against LGBT people
2000s neologisms
Linguistic controversies
LGBT-related controversies